Nuno Manuel Gavina do Couto (born November 20, 1969) is a Portuguese radio voice, producer and owner of OR2 Web Productions (based legally in Høvik, Norway). Gavina do Couto developed a Network composed by 21 Online Systems which broadcasts Audio and Visual Streams, known as OR2 Multimedia Streams. He also contributes to several online communities as an author and producer.

Early life
Gavina do Couto grew up in Sintra, Portugal with his family. He was raised Roman Catholic, yet, is now member of the Church of Norway. He studied Electrical engineering in a school near Lisbon.

Radio
Between 1985 and 1989, Gavina do Couto was responsible for the production and development of the several radio programs in Portuguese Local Radio Stations. After the 'shutdown' of Portuguese Pirate Radio Stations on 24 December 1988, he was a collaborator on the legalization of SINTRA FM Radio Project.

In 1990, the Radio program 'H2POP' returned to the so-called Portuguese Riviera, Sintra. Gavina do Couto was also co-responsible with the production of 'Good Morning Sintra', both transmitted by SINTRA FM RADIO Station.

Career
Since 1989, Gavina do Couto worked with his father, initially as a collaborator of the meanwhile biggest Club of Micro Computers in Portugal, with a registered Brand called ClubeMicro, represented by C.M.U. - Informatic, Electronic & Telecomunications, Lda and T.M.S.I. - Technology, Maintenance and Computer Systems Security. In 1991, was admitted to work in full-time on ClubeMicro. In 1999, after his father retirement, Gavina do Couto was nominated the Administrator of ClubeMicro and CEO of both Companies. With the emergence of Internet and alternative suppliers, ClubeMicro commercial activity was officially extinct in 2009.

Since 2015, Gavina do Couto is Owner of OR2 Web Productions (based legally in Høvik, Norway).

Author
Gavina do Couto is also Author of several online publications where he tries to explain Web II technology through metaphorical, symbolical or even pertinent perspectives based on simply to understand logical approaches and terminologies.
Besides unique blog posts, also writes genuine contents that are broadcast via OR2 Streams.

References

1969 births
Living people
Portuguese radio presenters
Portuguese radio producers
Portuguese writers
Radio writers